The 1988 Singapore Open was a women's tennis tournament played on outdoor hard courts in Singapore and was part of the Category 1 tier of the 1988 Virginia Slims World Championship Series. The tournament ran from 18 April through 24 April 1988. Unseeded Monique Javer won the singles title.

Finals

Singles

 Monique Javer defeated  Leila Meskhi 7–6(7–3), 6–3
 It was Javer's only title of the year and the 1st of her career.

Doubles

 Natalia Bykova /  Natalia Medvedeva defeated  Leila Meskhi /  Svetlana Parkhomenko 7–6(7–4), 6–3
 It was Bykova's 2nd title of the year and the 2nd of her career. It was Medvedeva's only title of the year and the 1st of her career.

References

External links
 ITF tournament edition details

Singapore Open
WTA Singapore Open
1988 in Singaporean sport
Women's sports competitions in Singapore